Saxby Range is a broad mountain range, rising to 2,450 m, in the Victory Mountains of Victoria Land, bounded by Jutland Glacier, Tucker Glacier, Pearl Harbor Glacier, and Midway Glacier. Named by the New Zealand Antarctic Place-Names Committee (NZ-APC) in 1982 after Eric Saxby, field leader and coordinator of NZ projects during the International Northern Victoria Land Project, 1981–82.

Mountain ranges of Victoria Land
Borchgrevink Coast